This is a list of places in the continent of Oceania which have standing links to local communities in other countries. In most cases, the association, especially when formalised by local government, is known as "town twinning" (usually in Europe) or "sister cities" (usually in the rest of the world), and while most of the places included are towns, the list also includes villages, cities, districts, and counties with similar links.

American Samoa
Pago Pago
 Oceanside, United States

Australia

Fiji

French Polynesia
Arue
 Le Mont-Dore, New Caledonia

Bora-Bora
 Port Vila, Vanuatu

Faaa
 Jiangyin, China

Huahine
 Boulouparis, New Caledonia

Mahina
 Gisborne, New Zealand

Nuku-Hiva
 Le Mont-Dore, New Caledonia

Paea

 Lifou, New Caledonia
 Sarraméa, New Caledonia

Papeete

 Changning (Shanghai), China
 Nice, France
 Nouméa, New Caledonia

Pirae
 Païta, New Caledonia

Punaauia
 Dumbéa, New Caledonia

Taiarapu-Ouest
 Nagaoka, Japan

Marshall Islands
Jaluit Atoll
 New Taipei, Taiwan

Kwajalein Atoll
 Taichung, Taiwan

Majuro

 Honolulu, United States
 Kawai, Japan
 Taipei, Taiwan

Wotje Atoll
 Tainan, Taiwan

Micronesia
Pohnpei
 Neosho, United States

New Caledonia
Boulouparis

 Banana, Australia
 Huahine, French Polynesia

Dumbéa

 Fréjus, France
 Lifou, New Caledonia
 Port Vila, Vanuatu
 Poum, New Caledonia
 Punaauia, French Polynesia

Lifou

 Dumbéa, New Caledonia
 Paea, French Polynesia
 Port Vila, Vanuatu

Le Mont-Dore

 Arue, French Polynesia
 Bélep, New Caledonia
 Luganville, Vanuatu
 Nuku-Hiva, French Polynesia
 Pouébo, New Caledonia
 Sunshine Coast, Australia
 Yogyakarta, Indonesia

Nouméa

 Gold Coast, Australia
 Nice, France
 Papeete, French Polynesia
 Taupo, New Zealand

New Zealand

Northern Mariana Islands
Saipan
 Maui County, United States

Tinian
 Tublay, Philippines

Palau
Airai
 Hsinchu, Taiwan

Koror

 Angeles City, Philippines
 Gilroy, United States

Papua New Guinea
Kokopo
 Mount Barker, Australia

Lae
 Cairns, Australia

Madang
 Batangas, Philippines

Mount Hagen
 Orange, Australia

Port Moresby

 Jinan, China
 Suva, Fiji
 Townsville, Australia

Tari
 Bandō, Japan

Vanimo
 Jayapura, Indonesia

Samoa
Apia

 Compton, United States
 Huizhou, China
 Shenzhen, China

Solomon Islands
Honiara

 Luganville, Vanuatu
 Mackay, Australia
 Port Vila, Vanuatu

Tonga
Haʻapai
 Dongguan, China

Nukuʻalofa
 Whitby, England, United Kingdom

Vanuatu
Luganville

 Honiara, Solomon Islands
 Le Mont-Dore, New Caledonia
 Zhuhai, China

Port Vila

 Bora-Bora, French Polynesia
 Dumbéa, New Caledonia
 Foshan, China
 Honiara, Solomon Islands
 Lifou, New Caledonia
 Shanghai, China
 Yinchuan, China

References

Oceania
Twin towns